The 1975–76 season of the European Cup football club tournament was won for the third consecutive time by Bayern Munich in the final against Saint-Étienne at Hampden Park, Glasgow. This was the first time that Bayern Munich participated as last year's Cup winners only.

It would be another 42 years before a club again won this tournament in three consecutive seasons, this being achieved by Real Madrid in 2018. Only Real Madrid, Ajax, and Bayern Munich won in three consecutive seasons.

Bracket

First round

|}

First leg

Second leg

Borussia Mönchengladbach won 7–2 on aggregate.

Juventus won 3–2 on aggregate.

Derby County won 3–1 on aggregate.

Real Madrid won 4–2 on aggregate.

Benfica won 7–1 on aggregate.

5–5 on aggregate; Újpesti Dózsa won on away goals.

3–3 on aggregate; Malmö FF won on penalties.

Bayern Munich won 8–1 on aggregate.

Dynamo Kyiv won 3–2 on aggregate.

ÍA won 5–2 on aggregate.

Saint-Étienne won 5–1 on aggregate.

Rangers won 5–2 on aggregate.

Hajduk Split won 8–0 on aggregate.

Molenbeek won 4–2 on aggregate.

Ruch Chorzów won 7–2 on aggregate.

PSV Eindhoven won 10–1 on aggregate.

Second round

|}

First leg

Second leg

Borussia Mönchengladbach won 4–2 on aggregate.

Real Madrid won 6–5 on aggregate.

Benfica won 6–5 on aggregate.

Bayern Munich won 2–1 on aggregate.

Dynamo Kyiv won 5–0 on aggregate.

Saint-Étienne won 4–1 on aggregate.

Hajduk Split won 7–2 on aggregate.

PSV Eindhoven won 7–1 on aggregate.

Quarter-finals

|}

First leg

Second leg

Bayern Munich won 5–1 on aggregate.

3–3 on aggregate; Real Madrid won on away goals.

Saint-Étienne won 3–2 on aggregate.

PSV Eindhoven won 3–2 on aggregate.

Semi-finals

|}

First leg

Second leg

Bayern Munich won 3–1 on aggregate.

Saint-Étienne won 1–0 on aggregate.

Final

Top scorers
The top scorers from the 1975–76 European Cup are as follows:

Notes

External links
1975–76 All matches – season at UEFA website
 European Cup results at Rec.Sport.Soccer Statistics Foundation
 All scorers 1975–76 European Cup according to protocols UEFA
1975/76 European Cup – results and line-ups (archive)

1975–76 in European football
European Champion Clubs' Cup seasons